ES Sétif, an Algerian professional association football club, has gained entry to Confederation of African Football (CAF) competitions on several occasions. They have represented Algeria in the Champions League on eleven occasions, the Confederation Cup on four occasions, the now-defunct Cup Winners' Cup two occasions.

History

ES Sétif whose team has regularly taken part in Confederation of African Football (CAF) competitions. Qualification for Algerian clubs is determined by a team's performance in its domestic league and cup competitions, ES Sétif have regularly qualified for the primary African competition, the African Cup, by winning the Ligue Professionnelle 1. ES Sétif have also achieved African qualification via the Algerian Cup and have played in the former African Cup Winners' Cup. the first match was against Kampala City FC and it ended in a 1–0 loss, As for the biggest win was in 1991 against ASC Linguère 7–1, and biggest loss was against Union Douala 5–0 in 1981. After six years of absence, ES Setif returned to continental competitions, this time in the African Cup of Champions Clubs, for the first time The following year and in the same competition, despite falling to the second division, Les Aigles Noirs managed to achieve the title for the first time against Iwuanyanwu Nationale of Nigeria and after the defeat in the First leg 1–0, they achieved an overwhelming victory in the Second leg 4–0 in a match that took place at Stade du 17 Juin in Constantine, After that, they met with Al Sadd SC in the final of the Afro-Asian Club Championship, and won the title for the first time, which is the only one of its kind in the history of Algerian football. In 1991 ES Sétif participated in the last continental participation in the twentieth century, where it reached the semi-finals, and in the Second round, Malik Zorgane scored the first hat-trick for ES Sétif against SC Gagnoa.

After 26 years won the CAF Champions League again
After regression in the level for a decade, ES Setif began to return to the higher level, where did achieve league title, 2006–07 season, the first in twenty years. To return to the continental competition again after 17 years but ES Sétif's career stopped in the first round against Olympique Khouribga by a penalty shootout, A year later, in the Confederation Cup, ES Sétif managed to reach the final for the first time, but was defeated against Stade Malien. in the same competition Abdelmalek Ziaya won the title of top goalscorer with 15 goal. After that ES Sétif participated several times between the CAF Confederation Cup and the CAF Champions League until 2014 CAF Champions League, where they achieved the first title in 26 years and the first for an Algerian club in the new version, The start of the journey was against ASFA Yennenga then against Coton Sport where did qualify to the group stage, Where draw put them in Group B with CS Sfaxien and Espérance de Tunis from Tunisia and Al-Ahly Benghazi from Libya. Then in the semi-finals they met TP Mazembe and won by Away goals rule, and in the final again with a club from RD Congo AS Vita Club and they won in the same way against TP Mazembe. To ensure the qualification card to FIFA Club World Cup and becomes the first Algerian club to participate in it, The first game was against New Zealand's Auckland City and they loss 1–0. Later another final, ES Sétif was waiting for this time in the CAF Super Cup the Egyptian giant Al-Ahly and they won by penalty shootout 6–5, which is the first title in the history of Algeria.

CAF competitions

Non-CAF competitions

Other competitions

CAF Super Cup

FIFA Club World Cup

Afro-Asian Club Championship

Statistics by country
Statistics correct as of game against Al Ahly Benghazi on April 28, 2021

CAF competitions

Non-CAF competitions

Statistics

By season
Information correct as of May 14, 2022.
Key

Pld = Played
W = Games won
D = Games drawn
L = Games lost
F = Goals for
A = Goals against
Grp = Group stage

MFP = Match for fifth place
PR = Preliminary round
R1 = First round
R2 = Second round
PR = Play-off round
R16 = Round of 16
QF = Quarter-final
SF = Semi-final

Key to colours and symbols:

Overall record

In Africa
:

Non-CAF competitions
:

International competitions goals
Statistics correct as of game against Al Ahly on May 14, 2022

Hat-tricks

Two goals one match

Non-CAF competitions goals

List of All-time appearances
This List of All-time appearances for ES Sétif in African competitions contains football players who have played for ES Sétif in African football competitions and have managed to accrue 20 or more appearances.

Gold Still playing competitive football in ES SétifStatistics correct as of game against Al Ahly Benghazi on April 28, 2021

African and arab opponents by cities

Notes

References

Africa
Algerian football clubs in international competitions